National Health Service Act may refer to any of the following Acts of Parliament:

 National Health Service Act 1946
 National Health Service (Scotland) Act 1947
 National Health Service (Amendment) Act 1949
 National Health Service Act 1951
 National Health Service Act 1952
 National Health Service Act 1977
 National Health Service Act 2006